Leucanopsis rhomboidea is a moth of the family Erebidae. It was described by Sepp in 1848. It is found in Mexico, Guatemala, Panama, Ecuador, Bolivia, Peru, Suriname and Brazil.

The larvae feed on Paspalum indicum.

References

rhomboidea
Moths described in 1848